Elaphe dione, commonly known as Dione's ratsnake, the steppe ratsnake, or the steppes ratsnake, is a species of snake in the family Colubridae. The species is native to Asia and Eastern Europe. There are no subspecies that are recognized as being valid.

Geographic range
E. dione is found in eastern Ukraine, southern and southeastern Russia, Central Asia, Iran, Afghanistan, Mongolia, parts of China, and Korea.

Habitat

Reproduction
E. dione is oviparous. An adult female may lay a clutch of 3–15 eggs in July or August.

Etymology
The specific name, dione, refers to the Greek mythological figure Dione who was the mother of Aphrodite.

References

Further reading
Boulenger GA (1894). Catalogue of the Snakes in the British Museum (Natural History). Volume II., Containing the Conclusion of the Colubridæ Aglyphæ. London: Trustees of the British Museum (Natural History). (Taylor and Francis, printers). xi + 382 pp. + Plates I-XX. (Coluber dione, pp. 44–45).
Pallas PS (1773). Reise durch verschiedenen Provinzen des Russischen Reichs, Zweiter Theil. [=Travels through different Provinces of the Russian Empire, Volume 2]. Saint Petersburg: Kaiserlichen Akademie der Wissenschaften. 744 pp. (Coluber dione, new species, p. 717). (in German and Latin).
Shannon FA (1956). "The Reptiles and Amphibians of Korea". Herpetologica 12 (1): 22–49.
Stejneger L (1907). Herpetology of Japan and Adjacent Territory. United States National Museum Bulletin 58. Washington, District of Columbia: Smithsonian Institution. xx + 577 pp. (Elaphe dione, new combination, pp. 315–318, Figure 272).

Elaphe
Snakes of Asia
Reptiles of Central Asia
Reptiles of the Middle East
Reptiles of Europe
Reptiles of Afghanistan
Snakes of China
Reptiles of Iran
Reptiles of Korea
Reptiles of Mongolia
Reptiles of Russia
Taxa named by Peter Simon Pallas
Reptiles described in 1773